Sunobinop (developmental code name IMB-115) is a nociceptin receptor partial agonist and opioid receptor pan-antagonist. As of March 2022, it is under investigation for the treatment of insomnia, fibromyalgia, and overactive bladder.

See also
 List of investigational sleep drugs § Nociceptin receptor agonists
 Nociceptin receptor

References

Bridged heterocyclic compounds
Carboxylic acids
Experimental drugs
Nociceptin receptor agonists
Quinoxalines